The 1999 North Texas Mean Green football team represented the University of North Texas in the 1999 NCAA Division I-A football season. The Mean Green played their home games at the Fouts Field in Denton, Texas, and competed in the Big West Conference. They were led by second-year head coach Darrell Dickey. The team finished the regular season with a 2–9 overall record and a 1–5 mark in Big West play.

Previous season
North Texas failed to improve on their 3–8 record in 1998.

Schedule

References

North Texas
North Texas Mean Green football seasons
North Texas Mean Green football